New Arab High School is an Arab state high school in Lod, Israel. The city's first Arab state high school, it opened in the former Lod Regional College seat building in November 2010. As of June 2011 it had 250 students. It was scheduled to move into a new facility in the Train neighbourhood of Lod, but as of June 2011 it remained in its temporary home.

References

Buildings and structures in Central District (Israel)
High schools in Israel
Lod